Orbis Pictus is a 1997 Slovak film, starring Dorota Nvotová, Marián Labuda, Božidara Turzonovová, Július Satinský, Emília Vášáryová and František Kovár. The film, directed by Martin Šulík, won Special Award of the Jury at the International Filmfestival Mannheim-Heidelberg in Baden-Württemberg, Germany as the Best Film in 1997. The film was selected as the Slovak entry for the Best Foreign Language Film at the 70th Academy Awards, but was not accepted as a nominee.

Plot
After being kicked out of boarding school sixteen-year-old Terezka goes on a fantasy-filled surrealistic journey to find her estranged mother. Along her way to Bratislava, she comes in contact with a mystical and strange cast of characters.

Cast
Dorota Nvotová as Terezka
 as chauffeur
Július Satinský as Drusa
 as bride
 as father
Marián Labuda as Emil
Božidara Turzonovová as Marta 
Emília Vášáryová as mother
 as Tomáš
Mojmír Caban as railroader
Ľubica Krkošková as railroader's wife
Donato Moriconi as Momo
Jakub Ursíny as groom
 as old woman
Róbert Zimermann as Imriško
Iveta Malachovská

Additional credits
 František Lipták - art director
 Milan Čorba - costume designer
 Ivan Seifert - sound
 Anita Hroššová - makeup artist
 Erik Panák - assistant director
 Dalibor Michalčík - assistant camera
 Viktor Fančovič - camera operator
 Jana Liptáková - script editor
 Ján Kittler - assistant sound
 Marek Štryncl - conductor
 Miroslav Hřebejk - sound mix

Awards 

Notes
A  Won Klára Issová for her role of Veronika in Nejasná správa o konci sveta by Juraj Jakubisko. The second nominee included Vilma Cibulková (for her role of in Výchova dívek v Čechách'' by Petr Koliha).

See also
 List of submissions to the 70th Academy Awards for Best Foreign Language Film
 List of Slovak submissions for the Academy Award for Best Foreign Language Film

References

External links

1997 films
1990s fantasy drama films
Slovak-language films
1997 drama films
1997 fantasy films
Films directed by Martin Šulík
Slovak fantasy drama films